The 2023 Fr8Auctions 208 was the 3rd stock car race of the 2023 NASCAR Craftsman Truck Series, and the 15th iteration of the event. The race was held on Saturday, March 18, 2023, in Hampton, Georgia, at Atlanta Motor Speedway, a  permanent tri-oval shaped superspeedway. The race was increased from 135 laps to 137 laps, due to a NASCAR overtime finish. Christian Eckes, driving for McAnally-Hilgemann Racing, would take the win after making a pass on Nick Sanchez for the lead on the final lap. This was Eckes' second career NASCAR Craftsman Truck Series win, and his first of the season. This was also the first win for McAnally-Hilgemann Racing in the truck series. To fill out the podium, Sanchez, driving for Rev Racing, and John Hunter Nemechek, driving for TRICON Garage, would finish 2nd and 3rd, respectively.

Background 
Atlanta Motor Speedway is a 1.54-mile race track in Hampton, Georgia, United States, 20 miles (32 km) south of Atlanta. It has annually hosted NASCAR Cup Series stock car races since its inauguration in 1960.

The venue was bought by Speedway Motorsports in 1990. In 1994, 46 condominiums were built over the northeastern side of the track. In 1997, to standardize the track with Speedway Motorsports' other two intermediate ovals, the entire track was almost completely rebuilt. The project made the track one of the fastest on the NASCAR circuit. In July 2021 NASCAR announced that the track would be reprofiled for the 2022 season to have 28 degrees of banking and would be narrowed from 55 to 40 feet which the track claims will turn racing at the track similar to restrictor plate superspeedways. Despite the reprofiling being criticized by drivers, construction began in August 2021 and wrapped up in December 2021. The track has seating capacity of 71,000 to 125,000 people depending on the tracks configuration.

Entry list 

 (R) denotes rookie driver.
 (i) denotes driver who is ineligible for series driver points.

Starting lineup 
Qualifying was scheduled to be held on Friday, March 17, at 3:00 PM EST, but was cancelled due to constant rain showers. The starting lineup would be determined by a performance-based metric system. As a result, Zane Smith, driving for Front Row Motorsports, would earn the pole.

Race results 
Stage 1 Laps: 45

Stage 2 Laps: 45

Stage 3 Laps: 47

Standings after the race 

Drivers' Championship standings

Note: Only the first 10 positions are included for the driver standings.

References 

NASCAR races at Atlanta Motor Speedway
2023 Fr8Auctions 208
2023 in sports in Georgia (U.S. state)